Berendrecht, Zandvliet and Lillo are three towns along the seaport docks north of the old city of Antwerp in Flanders, Belgium. The substantial 1983 merger with former municipalities, led in 2000 to the decentralisation of this enlarged municipality of Antwerp while these three towns merged into one of the city's districts, called Berendrecht-Zandvliet-Lillo or Bezali.

References

External links

Districts of Antwerp
Populated places in Antwerp Province